Torment and Toreros is the second album to be released by Marc and the Mambas. The album reached #28 on the UK album charts in August 1983. The song "Torment" was written by Marc Almond, Steven Severin of Siouxsie and the Banshees, Robert Smith of The Cure) – It also is the last studio album to go under the name "Marc and the Mambas". The next album Almond issued was credited to "Raoul and the Ruined". The Mambas' third album, Bite Black and Blues, is a live album and was initially only available via the Marc Almond fan club.

Track listing
All tracks composed by Marc Almond, except where indicated.

Disc 1
"Intro" (Almond, Sally Mambas) – 3:17
"Boss Cat" (Almond; original lyrics: Anne Stephenson, Ginny Hewes) – 4:17
"The Bulls" (Jacques Brel) – 2:18
"Catch a Fallen Star" – 5:12
"The Animal in You" (Almond, Mambas) – 7:19
"In My Room" (Joaquin Prieto; English lyrics: Lee Pockriss, Paul Vance) – 3:01
"First Time" – 3:38
"(Your Love Is A) Lesion" – 5:38
"My Former Self" (Almond, Annie Hogan) – 2:45
"Once Was" (Almond, The Venomettes) – 5:10

Universal Music Japan 2004 Extra Tracks

"Fun City" – 7:49
"Sleaze Take It, Shake It" – 7:17
"Sleaze Taking It, Shaking It" – 7:15

Disc 2
"The Untouchable One" (Almond, Jenkinson) – 6:03
"Blood Wedding" (Traditional Spanish; arranged by Marc and the Mambas) – 01:51
"Black Heart" (Almond, Hogan) – 04:50
"Medley: Narcissus/Gloomy Sunday/Vision" (Almond, Steve Sherlock/Sam M. Lewis, Rezső Seress/Peter Hammill) 11:46
"Torment" (Almond, Steven Severin, Robert Smith) – 4:21
"A Million Manias" (Almond, Foetus) – 5:52
"My Little Book of Sorrows" (Marc Almond) – 5:59
"Beat out that Rhythm on a Drum" (Georges Bizet, Oscar Hammerstein II) – 5:00

Universal Music Japan 2004 Extra Tracks

"Your Aura" (Marc Almond) – 6:18
"Mamba" (Mambas, Marc Almond) – 12:05
"First Time" – 3:38 (Venomettes, Almond)
"You'll Never see Me on a Sunday" (Almond, Hogan) – 2:51

Some Bizzare 2009 Extra Tracks

"Your Aura" (Marc Almond) – 6:18
"You'll Never see Me on a Sunday" (Almond, Hogan) – 2:51
"Mamba" (Mambas, Marc Almond) – 12:05

Personnel
Marc and the Mambas
Marc Almond – guitar, percussion, vocals
Annie Hogan – piano, harpsichord, Farfisa organ, vocals
Lee Jenkinson – bass, guitar, drums, vocals
Steve Sherlock – flute, saxophone
with:
Matt Johnson – guitar
Peter Ashworth – drums, timpani
Frank Want – drums
The Venomettes – string arrangements
Anne Stephenson – violin
Billy McGee – double bass
Ginny Hewes – violin
Martin McCarrick – cello
Technical
Flood, Marc Almond – mixing
Huw Feather – cover design
Peter Ashworth – photography

References

Marc and the Mambas albums
Marc Almond albums
1983 albums
Some Bizzare Records albums
Albums recorded at Trident Studios